The 2014 USTA Player Development Classic was a professional tennis tournament played on outdoor hard courts. It was the sixth edition of the tournament which was part of the 2014 ITF Women's Circuit, offering a total of $50,000 in prize money. It took place in Carson, California, United States, on July 14–20, 2014.

Singles main draw entrants

Seeds 

 1 Rankings as of July 7, 2014

Other entrants 
The following players received wildcards into the singles main draw:
  Kristie Ahn
  Jamie Loeb
  Chiara Scholl
  Chanelle Van Nguyen

The following players received entry from the qualifying draw:
  Jennifer Elie
  Danielle Lao
  Tatjana Maria
  Alexandra Stevenson

Champions

Singles 

  Nicole Gibbs def.  Melanie Oudin 6–4, 6–4

Doubles 

  Michaëlla Krajicek /  Olivia Rogowska def.  Samantha Crawford /  Sachia Vickery 7–6(7–4), 6–1

External links 
 2014 USTA Player Development Classic at ITFtennis.com
  

Carson
Hard court tennis tournaments in the United States
Tennis tournaments in California
2014 in American tennis
2014 in sports in California
July 2014 sports events in the United States